The 1982 Campeonato Brasileiro Série B, officially, the Taça de Prata 1982, was the 5th edition of the Campeonato Brasileiro Série B.The championship was performed by 48 teams.in the first phase, 36 teams, divided into 6 groups of 6 teams each, in which the two best teams of each group proceeded to the second phase, in which the twelve teams were divided into four groups of three teams.the first placed team of each group were promoted to the Second phase of the Taça de Ouro of the same year. the second placed teams of each group would proceed to the Third phase, in which they would be joined by the twelve clubs that hadn't qualified to the Second phase in the Taça de Ouro.the Third phase was disputed in a knockout tournament format, and the winners qualified to the Quarterfinals, with the knockout tournament continuing until two teams reached the finals.those were promoted to the Taça de Ouro of the following year.

First phase

Group A

Group B

Group C

Group D

Group E

Group F

Second phase

Group G

Group H

Group I

Group J

Third phase

|}

Quarterfinals

|}

Semifinals

|}

Finals

First leg

Second leg

Replay

References

Sources
 RSSSF

Campeonato Brasileiro Série B seasons
B